Elbert Pratt is a track and field coach. He currently resides in Monterrey, Mexico and serves as the Olympic Development Coach at the Tec de Monterrey and the President of the Pan American Pole Vault Association. Elbert Pratt also owns UniversalSport, a supplier of brand-name fitness equipment.

Accomplishments

President of Pan American Pole Vault Association, 2009–present

USA Track & Field, University Pole Vault Coach of the Year, 2001

National Track & Field Coach - Mexico, 1992–2007
 Coached National Teams in more than 60 international meets
 Coached Mexican athletes to 26 National Records

National President of Collegiate Track and Field - Mexico, 1996–2002

All-American Decathlete at Brigham Young University

Coaching experience
Olympic Development Coach, Tec de Monterrey - Mexico 2006–present
 Four consecutive National Team Championships – Women (2007–2009)
 Four consecutive National Team Championships – Men (2007–2010)

Head Coach, University of Juarez - Mexico, 1993–2002
 Eight consecutive National Team Championships-Women (1995–2002)
 Eight consecutive National Team Championships-Men (1995–2002)
 Ten athletes in Olympic Games and World Championships

National Olympic Coach - Saudi Arabia, 1979–1982
 Helped Saudi athletes break 17 national records in a three-year period
 Coached first medalists for Saudi Arabia in international competitions
 Assistant Track and Field Coach, Brigham Young University - Utah, 1976–1979
 Head Track Coach, University of Wyoming - Wyoming, 1976

Pratt organized, ran, and participated in many successful pole vault camps. He will be a featured coach 7–9 July 2011 in at UVU with his son Gary organized by Vaulted life

References

Living people
American expatriate sportspeople in Mexico
American Latter Day Saints
American track and field coaches
Year of birth missing (living people)